Ahmed satellite station is the second-oldest satellite station in India. Built with the intention of providing New Delhi with satellite coverage and promoting cross-country exchange of information, the satellite station was inaugurated on 25 February 1977 and named after the former president Fakhruddin Ali Ahmed. The station was reputably built at a cost of ₹100 million, with 60% of the station built indigenously and the other fraction purchased with help from a loan from Canada. It was built to conform to the strictest standards of the time and was predicted to be 99.99% accurate, with its tracking system accurate to 1/100 of a degree. It is situated in the Doiwala region of Dehradun, just off the nearby village of Chandmari, nestled in the sal trees of the region – a location chosen for its isolated natural surroundings and their capacity to function as a barrier to microwave or radio noise.

References

Dehradun district
Earth stations in India
1977 establishments in India